Xanthagaricus necopinatus is a species of the fungal family Agaricaceae. This species is the first generic report for Bangladesh. It was found in Chondrima Uddan, Dhaka district of Bangladesh.

References

Fungi of Bangladesh
Agaricaceae